Aroma was a town of ancient Caria, inhabited during Roman times. 

Its site is located near Kavaklı in Asiatic Turkey.

References

Populated places in ancient Caria
Former populated places in Turkey
Roman towns and cities in Turkey
History of Aydın Province